Evgeni Vladimirovich Rukavicin (born 26 February 1977)  is a Russian figure skating coach. He coaches ladies' and men's singles.

Career 

Evgeni Rukavicin competed at 1995 Russian Figure Skating Championships where he placed 10th. He became a coach after his retirement from competitive figure skating when he was 19.

His most remarkable pupil was Konstantin Menshov. Rukavicin coached Menshov to the 2011 Russian National title and 2014 European bronze medal.

His current students include
Dmitri Aliev; 2020 European champion, 2016-17 Junior Grand Prix Final champion and 2017 World Junior silver medallist.
Makar Ignatov;

Anastasia Gubanova

Roman Galay
Maria Talalaikina

His former students included also 
Polina Agafonova; 
Maria Artemieva; 
Alisa Fedichkina;.
Gordei Gorshkov; 
Ksenia Makarova; 
Alena Leonova;
Diana Pervushkina; 
Serafima Sakhanovich; 
Vladislav Sesganov;
Anton Shulepov;
Ihor (Igor) Reznuchenko
Elizaveta Nugumanova

His students are known for their jumps. Konstantin Menshov is one of the few skaters to have landed two quad jumps in a short program and three quads in a free skate. Vladislav Sesganov practiced quad lutz and quad lutz - triple toe loop combination. He landed quad lutz in a sanctioned international competition in 2013. Anton Shulepov also made attempts of the quad lutz in competitions in 2016. Dmitri Aliev landed quad lutz-triple toe combination in short program at the competition in Saint Petersburg in 2017. Some of students coached by Rukavicin (Menshov, Aliev, Gorshkov) also practice quad loop. Gordei Gorshkov attempted quad loop at a domestic sanctioned competition in 2014, but the jump was downgraded.

References 

1977 births
Living people
Russian figure skating coaches
Figure skaters from Saint Petersburg